Elm Lake is a lake in South Dakota, in the United States.

Elm River takes its name from the nearby Elm River.

See also
List of lakes in South Dakota

References

Lakes of South Dakota
Bodies of water of Brown County, South Dakota